Cooper Criswell (born July 24, 1996) is an American professional baseball pitcher in the Tampa Bay Rays organization. He made his MLB debut in 2021 with the Los Angeles Angels.

Early career

Criswell grew up in Carrollton, Georgia and attended Carrollton High School.

Criswell began his college baseball career at Southern Union State Community College. As a sophomore, he compiled a 10–1 record with a 2.54 ERA and committed to continue his college career at the University of North Carolina. In his lone season with the Tar Heels, Criswell went 6–2 with a 2.99 ERA and 86 strikeouts in  innings.

Professional career

Los Angeles Angels
Criswell was selected in the 13th round by the Los Angeles Angels in the 2018 Major League Baseball draft. He began his professional career the following year with the Inland Empire 66ers of the  Class A-Advanced California League. Criswell was assigned to the Double-A Rocket City Trash Pandas at the beginning of the 2021 minor league season. Criswell made 12 starts for Double-A Rocket City, going 6–4 with a 3.71 ERA and 85 strikeouts. On July 31, Criswell was promoted to the Triple-A Salt Lake Bees. After going 2–1 with a 3.98 ERA and 27 strikeouts through four starts, on August 27, the Angels selected Criswell's contract. He made his debut the same night, giving up three runs in 1.1 innings pitched. He was optioned back to Salt Lake the next day. On April 7, 2022, Criswell was placed on the 10-day injured list with a right shoulder strain and was moved to the 60-day injured list the next day to make room on the 40-man roster for Kyle Tyler.

Tampa Bay Rays
On July 16, 2022, Criswell was claimed off waivers by the Tampa Bay Rays. He was designated for assignment on July 19. He cleared waivers and was sent outright to the Triple-A Durham Bulls on July 21.

He was added back as a COVID-19 replacement player on September 12, 2022, and returned to Triple-A the next day.

References

External links

North Carolina Tar Heels bio

1996 births
Living people
People from Carrollton, Georgia
Baseball players from Georgia (U.S. state)
Major League Baseball pitchers
Los Angeles Angels players
Tampa Bay Rays players
North Carolina Tar Heels baseball players
Inland Empire 66ers of San Bernardino players
Rocket City Trash Pandas players
Salt Lake City Bees players
Durham Bulls players